The PZL.38 Wilk (wolf) (PZL-38) was a Polish heavy fighter developed and manufactured by PZL state factory in 1937. Intended for use primarily as a fighter-bomber, the Polish Air Force also envisioned it replacing light fighters in long-range operations, along with being able to serve as a light bomber. Only two examples were built before the project was cancelled in favor of a planned improved variant, the PZL.48 Lampart (itself never built owing to the outbreak of WWII).

Design and development
In 1934 the Polish Air Force ordered a new multi-role heavy fighter-bomber. It was initially slated to replace fighters in both pursuit and escort duties, and light bombers, along with attack aircraft. The idea of a long-range, twin-engined, relatively heavily-armed,  multi-role strategic fighter was a popular concept among many air forces during the late Interwar Period, and would lead to many heavy fighter designs. Poland was not immune to this line of thought, and in an internal PZL competition a design of engineer Franciszek Misztal won and was given the designation PZL.38 Wilk. Its construction used the diminished aerodynamic profile and configuration from the PZL.37 Łoś medium bomber. The powerplant was to be the 490-hp PZL Foka (Seal) light-weight V-engine, designed by Stanisław Nowkuński of Polish Skoda Works (then PZL WS-1). Unfortunately, Nowkuński died in the Tatry mountains on 30 July 1936, and work on the engine slowed. Due to technical problems, overheating and vibration, it was decided to use a foreign engine.

In 1937 two prototypes of PZL.38 were built. The second one (PZl.38/II) received the American Ranger SGV-770B engines (420-450 hp), which were less powerful than the PZL "Foka" engine. As a result, the prototype didn't meet expected performance.  The second prototype flew first in April or May 1936. The first prototype PZl.38/I, received the PZL Foka engine. The airplane was shown in 1938 at the Paris Air Show.  It was flown only in February or March 1939 and also did not meet expected performance (estimated maximum speed was 520 km/h, while it hardly reached 465 km/h). It was also too heavy (2155 kg instead of 1715 kg) and had too small useful load. Because of these facts, further development of PZL.38 "Wilk" aircraft and "Foka" engine was abandoned in the Spring of 1939, in a favour of the new construction PZL.48 "Lampart" - which was a modification of "Wilk" with radial engines.

Description
It was a twin-engine low-wing cantilever monoplane of metal construction, metal covered. The fuselage was semi-monocoque, elliptic in cross-section. The crew of two - pilot and rear gunner/bombardier/observer sat under separate canopies, far from each other, fitted with dual controls. A canopy of pilot's cockpit opened aside. Three part wing, outer parts were built around light closed profiles. Wings fitted with slats and split flaps. Twin vertical stabilizers. Engines in underwing nacelles. Retractable landing gear, with main wheels retracting into engine nacelles, and a rear skid. Three-blade variable (P.38/I) or two-blade fixed propellers (PZL.38/II). Fuel tanks in wings - 500 L. Armament: fixed 20 mm FK-A gun (planned) and two 7.92 mm PWU wz.36 machine guns in the fuselage nose, twin 7.92 mm PWU wz.37 machine gun of a rear gunner, hiding in the fuselage. It could carry one 300-kg bomb.

Operational history
At the time of the German invasion of Poland, both prototypes were still not able to fly and remained in the factory at Okęcie in Warsaw. They were captured by the Germans in a damaged state, their further fate is not known.

Specifications

See also

References 

 Cynk, Jerzy B. Polish Aircraft 1893–1939. London: Putnam, 1971. .
 Glass, Andrzej. Polskie Konstrukcje Lotnicze 1893-1939 (Polish aviation constructions 1893-1939). Warsawa, Poland: WKiŁ,  1977. (Polish language, no ISBN)
 Glass, Andrzej. PZL 38 Wilk. Warsawa, Poland: Wydawnictwo Militaria, 1995. . (Polish language)

External links 

  PZL.38 translated description, photos and drawings at Ugolok Neba

1930s Polish fighter aircraft
PZL aircraft
Low-wing aircraft
Aircraft first flown in 1938
Twin piston-engined tractor aircraft